There are 84 villages in Savarkundla tehsil under the khuman kathi darbars, Vanshiyali, Vanda, Gadhakda, Ramgadh, Vijpadi, Chikhali, Piyava, Dhar, Juna Savar, Bhuva, Badhada, Vijyanagar, Likhala, Mota Zinzuda, Nana Zinzuda, Vadal, Khadsali, Nesadi, Kanatalav, Oliya, Charkhadiya, Gordka, Bhokarva, Bhenkara, Navagam, Luvara,Dhajdi, Amrutvel.

Demographics
According to the 2011 census, Savarkundla had a population of 78,354. Males constituted 52% of the population and females 48%. 11% of the population was under 6 years of age.

Blacksmith (Luhar) is the largest community. This is due to iron industries like weighing scales and tools. Several other communities also abide there.

Geography
Savarkundla is situated on the southern Saurashtra plateau. It is an area of hilly terrain. Ground water table is very low. The water contains a high level of total dissolved solids along with excess levels of sodium and phosphate. The water extracted from bore-wells is hot. The Navli river flows from south to north during the monsoon season. Moreover, this river flows exactly from the between of this town and thus dividing it in two parts: Savar and Kundla. Kundla is western bank of Navli and Savar lies on eastern bank.

Economy
Savarkundla is known for producing weighing scales. One third of its total population is connected to this industry. It is the only manufacturer of mechanical weighing scales in India. It is emerging as an assembly hub for electronic weighing scales.

Savarkundla is active in agriculture, producing fruit such as Guava(Jamfal), and vegetables. Cotton and groundnut are the main crops. Rain is the main source of irrigation.

In 2009, a bio-waste power project was developed by Amreli Power Project Ltd. of 10 MWe capacity. Savarkundla has no GIDC.

Education
Savarkundla has a literacy rate of 75%, higher than the national average of 59.5%: male literacy is 85%, and female literacy is 60%.

Three educational institutions are affiliated to Saurashtra University:

 Shri V.D. Kanakia Arts College
 Shri M.R. Sanghvi Commerce College
 Smt. V.D. Ghelani Mahila Arts College
The city has the Industrial Training Institute Savarkundla
 Shree Badhada Kelvani Mandal Sanchalit, 
 Shri K. K. Virani Institute of Pharmacy and Research Center
 Shree G.M. Bilakhia Arts college, Vanda (Now, Closed permanently)
Secondary schools include Swaminarayan Gurukul Secondary and Higher Secondary School [English Medium & Gujarati Medium (Science and Commerce)], M.L Sheth English Medium School, St Thomas English Medium School, V.D. Kanakia Arts College and M.R. Sanghvi Commerce College, P. H. Banjara High School, J. V. Modi High School, S. V. Doshi Girls High School,  and K. K. High School.

Notables 
Shri Morarji Desai, former Prime Minister of India attended the then Kundla school (now J V Modi High School). His father served in the same school as a teacher.

Culture
Darbargadh, a building in Savarkundla, is believed to be made by Jogidas Khuman, whose village, Ambardi, is 15 km from Savarkundla and is also known as 'Jogidas Khuman's Ambardi'. Multiple examples of cultural groups within Ambardi (e.g.,Kasvala, Malani, Chodavadiya and Sabhaya).

Savarkundla is also famous for its herbal fireworks. On the night of Diwali, people from both Savar and Kundla gather on the riverfront and throw handmade fireworks, called "Ingoriya", to the opposite side. These fireworks are made by stuffing explosives inside the fruits of the Ingoriya tree. Traditionally, a fight between the two native cultural groups follows.

References

Cities and towns in Amreli district